The Sheldon National Wildlife Refuge is a  national wildlife refuge on the northern border of the U.S. state of Nevada. A very small part extends northward into Oregon. It is managed by the United States Fish and Wildlife Service (USFWS) as the Nevada component of the Sheldon-Hart Mountain National Wildlife Refuge Complex, which is headquartered in Lakeview, Oregon. The Sheldon Refuge was noted for its population of wild horses, now all removed.

History
In 1931, the refuge was established under executive order to carry out three central goals: First, the refuge was to provide a habitat for the "antelope" (more properly called the pronghorn), an animal whose population was in decline during the early 1900s. Second, conservation efforts were put forth to protect native fish, wildlife, and plants. The refuge contains the Virgin Valley Opal Mining District which was grandfathered-in with its mineral rights. Finally, the refuge was to serve as an inviolate migratory bird sanctuary.

Description
Advocates characterize Sheldon as one of the few intact sagebrush steppe ecosystems in the Great Basin, one that hosts a variety of wildlife endemic to the unique environment.

The Sheldon National Wildlife Refuge occupies an arid zone of volcanic terrain.
Geothermal hot springs provide some water to a swimming pool and shower house in the campground.

Flora and fauna
The dominant plant life consists of drought-tolerant species such as sagebrush, juniper, mountain mahogany, bitterbrush, and aspen.

In this forbidding landscape lives a large population of free-range fauna. Desert fishes, greater sage-grouse, migratory birds, mule deer, and the pygmy rabbit are all residents, with the pronghorn – North America's fastest land mammal – being the best known and numbering around 3,500. There are also large herds of mule deer, and a small but self-sustaining population of bighorn sheep.

The bighorn is not strictly native to the Sheldon Refuge, having been extirpated there during the frontier era and re-introduced about 1930. The pronghorn played a key role in the refuge's history, as approximately 94 percent of the current protected land area was originally set aside as the Charles Sheldon Antelope Range in 1936. The refuge is the home of the Alvord chub, an endemic fish species of limited geographic distribution.

Formerly the wildlife reserve hosted mustang, feral horses, but by 2014 these had all been removed (see below).

Minerals
Opal miners have been active in the valley since 1906. The refuge contains the very active and popular Virgin Valley Opal Mining District whose mineral rights were grandfathered-in with the establishment of the sanctuary.
Rockhounds search for precious opal, agates, petrified wood, carnelian, obsidian, rhyolite, jasper, hyalite opal, and psilomelane, among other semiprecious gemstones.

The Virgin Valley Mining District is known for black opals, the Nevada State Gemstone, still very active with multiple fee-dig mines.

Roads and nearby communities
A point within the refuge is also the farthest place in the contiguous US from a McDonald's restaurant, at just 115 miles (185 kilometers).

Nevada State Route 140 traverses the refuge from east to west and is the only paved road within the refuge. The nearest community of any size is Denio, Nevada, 14 miles from the refuge's eastern boundary. County Road 8A connects to Cedarville, California.

Feral horse controversy

The population of Sheldon horses was the descendants of horses used by the U.S. Army. Harry Wilson was one of the ranchers that sold horses to the U.S. cavalry. When the Wilsons owned the Virgin Valley Ranch, they worked with the Army, which provided thoroughbred stallions that were bred with the Wilsons' standardbreds.

Proposals to cull some of the alleged excess population of the mustang in the Sheldon National Wildlife Refuge were drawing public concern . The official USFWS position, as stated on their refuge's website, was "horses and burros are not native to Sheldon Refuge. They are descended from domestic stock turned loose around the turn of the twentieth century. They are primarily grass eaters, and their grazing can devastate native vegetation and cause severe damage to riparian habitat." Some private-sector advocates, such as the Sierra Club, agree with the USFWS position.

In response, the American Wild Horse Preservation Campaign has accused the USFWS of conducting "helicopter round-ups during foaling season" in the Sheldon Refuge. Due to the negative impact horses and burros have on riparian areas and the resulting strain on native wildlife, Sheldon NWR officials announced a decision to remove all horses from the refuge by 2014 and they all were removed.

References

1931 establishments in Nevada
1931 establishments in Oregon
National Wildlife Refuges in Nevada
National Wildlife Refuges in Oregon
Protected areas established in 1931
Protected areas of the Great Basin
Protected areas of Humboldt County, Nevada
Protected areas of Lake County, Oregon
Protected areas of Washoe County, Nevada